Catherine Herbert, Countess of Carnarvon ( Anne Catherine Tredick Wendell, also known as Mrs Geoffrey Grenfell and Mrs Stuart Mommand; November 25, 1900 – 1977) was an American heiress who married into the British aristocracy.

Early life
Catherine was born on November 25, 1900. She was the eldest daughter of Marian ( Fendall) Wendell (d. 1949) and Jacob Wendell III (d. 1911), of New York and Sandridgebury, Sandridge, Hertfordshire. Her younger sister, Philippa Fendall Wendell, was the wife of Randolph Stewart, 12th Earl of Galloway. Her brothers were Jacob Wendell (who married Eileen V. Carr) and Reginald L. Wendell.

Her father, a Harvard graduate and Broadway actor, died of pneumonia shortly before he was to appear in the leading role in What the Doctor Ordered at the Astor Theatre. Her maternal grandfather was Union soldier, Philip Richard Fendall III, and her great-grandparents were Elizabeth Mary ( Young) Fendall and Philip Richard Fendall II, the District Attorney of the District of Columbia. Her paternal grandfather was Jacob Wendell of Jacob Wendell Co.

Personal life
On 17 July 1922, Catherine was married to Lord Porchester at St Margaret's, Westminster. He was the son and heir of George Herbert, 5th Earl of Carnarvon and Almina Herbert, Countess of Carnarvon and upon his father's death on 5 April 1923, Henry became the 6th Earl of Carnarvon and Catherine became Countess of Carnarvon. Before their divorce in 1936, they were the parents of two children:

 Henry George Reginald Molyneux Herbert, 7th Earl of Carnarvon (1924–2001), who married Jean Margaret Wallop, daughter of Hon. Oliver Malcolm Wallop, in 1956.
 Lady Anne Penelope Marian Herbert (1925–1990), who married her second cousin, Capt. Reinier Gerrit Anton van der Woude, son of R.A.G van der Woude and Mary Wendell (daughter of Harvard professor Barrett Wendell) in 1945.

After their divorce, Lady Carnarvon married, as his second wife, Lt.-Cdr. Geoffrey Seymour Grenfell (1898–1940) in 1938. Geoffrey was a son of Riversdale Francis John Grenfell (son of Charles Seymour Grenfell) and Cecil Blanche ( Lubbock) Grenfell. Grenfell died in action during World War II just two years after their marriage.

Ten years after his death, she married Don Stuart Momand (d. 1977) in 1950, who had previously been married to Virginia Ten Eyck Rice (a daughter of William Lowe Rice).

Catherine Herbert, Countess of Carnarvon, died in 1977.

Descendants
Through her son Henry, she was a grandmother of George Herbert, 8th Earl of Carnarvon, Henry "Harry" Herbert, and Lady Carolyn Herbert.

Through her daughter Penelope, she was a grandmother of Michael Gerrit van der Woude, David Anthony van der Woude, and Penelope Catherine Mary van der Woude.

References

Bibliography
 

1900 births
1977 deaths
Catherine
Catherine
Catherine
British countesses
People from Highclere
American emigrants to the United Kingdom